Samuel Paul Meston (19 November 1882 – 9 January 1960) was an English cricketer. He played for Gloucestershire in 1906 and Essex between 1907 and 1908. He later moved to Canada where he continued playing cricket.

References

External links

1882 births
1960 deaths
English cricketers
Gloucestershire cricketers
Essex cricketers
People from Islington (district)
Cricketers from Greater London